Hippomedon (Ἰππομέδων, gen.: Ἰππομέδοντος) may refer to several figures in Greek mythology:

 Hippomedon, one of the Seven against Thebes.
 Hippomedon, father of Ereuthalion.
Hippomedon, son of Maenalus (or Hippasus) and the nymph Ocyrhoe, a defender of Troy killed by Neoptolemus.
Hippomedon, father of Menoites. His son was another defender of Troy and was killed by Teucer.

Notes

References 

 Apollodorus, The Library with an English Translation by Sir James George Frazer, F.B.A., F.R.S. in 2 Volumes, Cambridge, MA, Harvard University Press; London, William Heinemann Ltd. 1921. ISBN 0-674-99135-4. Online version at the Perseus Digital Library. Greek text available from the same website.
 Quintus Smyrnaeus, The Fall of Troy translated by Way. A. S. Loeb Classical Library Volume 19. London: William Heinemann, 1913. Online version at theio.com
 Quintus Smyrnaeus, The Fall of Troy. Arthur S. Way. London: William Heinemann; New York: G.P. Putnam's Sons. 1913. Greek text available at the Perseus Digital Library.

Trojans
People of the Trojan War